This is a list of tennis players who have represented the Slovenia Fed Cup team in an official Fed Cup match. Slovenia have taken part in the competition since 1992.

Players

References

External links
Tenis Slovenija

Fed Cup
Lists of Billie Jean King Cup tennis players